Albert Gallatin is a bronze statue by James Earle Fraser. It commemorates Albert Gallatin, who founded New York University and served as United States Secretary of the Treasury.

It is located north of the Treasury Building (Washington, D.C.), at 15th Street and Pennsylvania Avenue, N.W. Washington, D.C.
It was authorized by Congress on January 11, 1927. 
It was dedicated on October 15, 1947.

The inscription reads: (Base, front:)
ALBERT GALLATIN
SECRETARY OF THE TREASURY
GENIUS OF FINANCE
SENATOR AND REPRESENTATIVE
COMMISSIONER FOR THE TREATY OF GHENT
MINISTER TO FRANCE AND GREAT BRITAIN
AND STEADFAST
CHAMPION OF DEMOCRACY
1761–1849

See also
 List of memorials to Albert Gallatin
 List of public art in Washington, D.C., Ward 6

References

External links

http://guide.trustedtours.com/destinations/washington-dc/albert-gallatin-statue/
http://www.hmdb.org/marker.asp?marker=2129
https://www.flickr.com/photos/grundlepuck/232434245/
https://www.flickr.com/photos/wallyg/5153729673/

1941 sculptures
Bronze sculptures in Washington, D.C.
Artworks in the collection of the National Park Service
Outdoor sculptures in Washington, D.C.
Sculptures of men in Washington, D.C.
Statues in Washington, D.C.
Works by James Earle Fraser (sculptor)
President's Park